The Riken integrated database of mammals is an integrated database of multiple large-scale programs that have been promoted by the Riken institute.

See also
 Riken

References

External links
 http://metadb.riken.jp/metadb/download/SciNetS_ria254i

Biological databases
Mammalogy